Sugarloaf Ridge State Park is a state park in Northern California, United States. Located in the Mayacamas Mountains north of Kenwood, the park straddles the boundary between Sonoma and Napa counties. The park is also home to the volunteer-run Robert Ferguson Observatory. Camping, picnicking, horseback riding, mountain biking, stargazing, fishing and hiking are common attractions of Sugarloaf. The park boasts 25 miles of trails with trails ranging from less than a mile to 8.8 miles, and elevation gains reaching 2,500 feet.

The East peak contains an extensive microwave antenna. This site was featured in several articles of the Napa Valley Sentinel.

Sugarloaf Ridge was one of the first parks to close under the California State Parks plan to close up to 70 of its 278 parks due to budget cuts. The closures were deemed necessary to achieve an $11 million reduction in the next fiscal year 2011/12, that amount increasing to $22 million in the following fiscal year 2012/13. The park was reopened by Team Sugarloaf in June 2012 to restore access to camping and hiking trails.

The park's official address is 2605 Adobe Canyon Road, Kenwood, CA 95452.

History
The Onasáti (Wappo) were the first known inhabitants of the region, settling on along the Sonoma Creek 1500 years ago. They relied on various resources of the region especially acorns and berries, and are known for their farming and basketry abilities. Spaniards attempted to takeover the area in 1823, failing. Later, the cholera epidemic dwindled the numbers of the Wappos, who were ultimately relocated to Indian reservations by the American government.

In the 1870s farming increased in the Sugarloaf region. Business owners in town began hiring "gentlemen farmers" to manage their ranches along the Sugarloaf Ridge while the business owners remained in the town. Some even made livings off burning trees of the Sugarloaf region to make and sell charcoal.

By 1920, the California government had dammed the creek for public water use while the region attracted campers, picnickers, and Boy Scout troops. Land owners began leasing land for animal grazing in 1942. Finally in 1964, the state of California admitted Sugarloaf as a California State Park.

Vegetation
Sugarloaf Ridge State Park's forests consist of bay laurel, Douglas firs, big-leaf maple, madrone, coastal redwoods, California buckeye and alder trees as well as an abundance of oaks including live, valley, and mixed oaks. Poison oak and stinging nettles are found along the Sonoma Creek and can be a threat to hikers. Shrubs of the chaparral include manzanita, chamise, California lilac, coyote bush, toyon, and winebush. Sugarloaf experiences a colorful spring with a wide array of wildflowers: California poppies, cream cups, lupines, penstemons, buttercups, peas, shooting stars, trilliums, Indian warriors and mariposa lily. Golden fairy lantern, zigadene, and fritillarias are in certain regions of the enclosure as well. Summer boasts the blossoming of even more flowers including clarkias, scarlet larkspurs, farewell-to-springs, Mariposa lilies, monkey flowers, and Indian pinks and yellow star thistles and tarweeds. At least 400 plants species are found in Sugarloaf Ridge State Park.

Wildlife
Deer, as well as gray fox, bobcats, coyote and mountain lions inhabit the park. Turkey vultures can be seen swarming regions of the park as well. Trout are present in the streams and are a common attraction for visitors, especially beginning in late spring to early summer. Black bears have also been found within the park's boundaries.

Bald Mountain
As the main attraction for hikers, this peak can be reached by hiking the park's trails. Upon reaching the summit, Mount Saint Helena, Napa Valley, and a distant view of the Sierra Nevada Mountains can be seen. The San Francisco Bay Area, Mt. Diablo, and the Sugarloaf Ridge can be seen when facing the south. Mount Tamalpais lies southwest while the Coastal Range and a view of the distant Pacific Ocean lie to the west.

Sonoma Creek Falls
Sonoma Creek falls down a 25-foot descent, landing on boulders and jagged rocks of the creek below with maple trees and ferns shading the area. It is best to visit during the rainy winter season.

Weather
The temperature in the region remains fairly moderate with a summer high in the 90s and low in the 40s. Winter experiences temperatures ranging from the 30s to 60s. An average of 40 inches of rain fall in the park per year, mostly between November and April, with occasional snowfall.

See also
California Department of Parks and Recreation

References

External links

 Official park website
 Robert Ferguson Observatory, located in the park
 Sugarloaf Ridge State Park, California Department of Parks and Recreation
 Park Brochure, California Department of Parks and Recreation

State parks of California
Parks in Napa County, California
Parks in Sonoma County, California
Mayacamas Mountains
Ridges of California
Landforms of Napa County, California
Landforms of Sonoma County, California
Bay Area Ridge Trail